The Harlow Old Fort House is a First Period historic house at 119 Sandwich Street in Plymouth, Massachusetts.

History
According to legend, Sergeant William Harlow built the house in 1677 using timbers from the Pilgrims' original fort on Burial Hill, which they had built in 1621–1622. Harlow received permission to use the timbers after the fort was torn down at the end of King Philip's War in 1677. The house was surveyed by an architectural historian in 1996, who determined a construction date of 1700 or later.  The Harlow family owned the house for nearly 250 years until the Plymouth Antiquarian Society acquired it and hired Joseph Everett Chandler to restore the house. The Antiquarian Society opened it to the public in 1921. In 1974, the house was added to the National Register of Historic Places. It is still open to the public and features seventeenth-century re-enactors.

Images

See also
Plymouth Village Historic District
Sgt. William Harlow Family Homestead
National Register of Historic Places listings in Plymouth County, Massachusetts
List of the oldest buildings in Massachusetts

References

External links
Harlow Family website
Plymouth Antiquarian Society 

Houses in Plymouth, Massachusetts
Museums in Plymouth, Massachusetts
Historic house museums in Massachusetts
Living museums in Massachusetts
Plymouth Colony
Houses completed in 1677
Museums established in 1921
1921 establishments in Massachusetts
History of Plymouth County, Massachusetts
National Register of Historic Places in Plymouth County, Massachusetts
1677 establishments in Massachusetts
Houses on the National Register of Historic Places in Plymouth County, Massachusetts